The Sigtuna Ladies Open was a women's professional golf tournament on the Swedish Golf Tour played annually from 1990 until 1993. It was always held at the Sigtuna Golf Club in Sigtuna, Sweden.

Winners

References

Swedish Golf Tour (women) events
Golf tournaments in Sweden
Defunct sports competitions in Sweden
Recurring sporting events established in 1990
Recurring sporting events disestablished in 1993